Common names: long-tailed blindsnakes, long-tailed blind snakes, worm snakes.
Ramphotyphlops is a genus of nonvenomous blind snakes of the family Typhlopidae. Member species of the genus are native to southern Asia and southeast Asia, as well as many islands in the southern Pacific Ocean. They occur in a wide variety of habitats. Currently,  22 species are recognized as being valid.

Description and ecology
Growing to 50–750 mm (2–30 in) in length, snakes of the genus Ramphotyphlops occur in a variety of colors from light beige, to red, to blackish brown. They are often difficult to identify properly without the aid of optical magnification. Their heads are conical and tapered into their bodies.

These snakes can be found in ant and termite nests, as well as under fallen leaves and in holes in logs.  They are believed to feed on earthworms, as well as the larvae and eggs of ants and termites. They are thought to be oviparous, although this has only been observed in a few species.

Species

*) A taxon author in parentheses indicates that the species was originally described in a genus other than Ramphotyphlops.
**) Not including the nominate subspecies.
T) Type species.

References

Further reading
Fitzinger L (1843). Systema Reptilium, Fasciculus Primus, Amblyglossae. Vienna: Braumüller & Seidel. 106 pp. + indices. (Ramphotyphlops, new genus, p. 24). (in Latin).

External links

 
 Ramphotyphlops at Lamington National Park. Accessed 29 August 2007.

 
Snake genera
Taxa named by Leopold Fitzinger